The 2015–16 Brown Bears men's basketball team represented Brown University during the 2015–16 NCAA Division I men's basketball season. The Bears, led by fourth year head coach Mike Martin, played their home games at the Pizzitola Sports Center and were members of the Ivy League. They finished the season 8–20, 3–11 in Ivy League play to finish in a tie for seventh place.

Previous season 
The Bears finished the season 13–18, 4–10 in Ivy League play to finish in a tie for seventh place.

Departures

Incoming Transfers

Recruiting

Recruiting class of 2016

Roster

Schedule

|-
!colspan=9 style="background:#321414; color:#FFFFFF;"| Non-conference regular season

|-
!colspan=9 style="background:#321414; color:#FFFFFF;"| Ivy League regular season

References

Brown Bears men's basketball seasons
Brown
Brown
Brown